The 2013–14 FC Kuban Krasnodar season was the third successive season that the club played in the Russian Premier League, the highest tier of football in Russia. They finished the season in 8th place and were knocked out at the fifth round of the Russian Cup by Zvezda Ryazan on penalties after a 2–2 draw.

Leonid Kuchuk left the club during the summer at the end of his contract and was replaced by Igor Osinkin in a caretaker capacity. Osinjkin left the club on 31 July, being replaced by Dorinel Munteanu, but Munteanu only lasted two and a half months before being sacked and replaced by Viktor Goncharenko.

Squad
Updated 8 March 2014, according to the club's official website.Transfers
Summer

In:

Out:

Winter

In:

Out:

Competitions

Russian Premier League

Matches

League table

Russian Cup

Europa League

Qualifying rounds

Group stages

Squad statistics

Appearances and goals

|-
|colspan="14"|Players away from Kuban Krasnodar on loan:|-
|colspan="14"|Players who left Kuban Krasnodar during the season:''

|}

Top scorers

Disciplinary record

References

FC Kuban Krasnodar seasons
Kuban Krasnodar